Metalhead is a fictional character appearing in American comic books published by Marvel Comics. The character appeared in their futuristic comic book line dubbed Marvel 2099 in X-Men 2099. His creators were John Francis Moore and Ron Lim.

Fictional character biography
Eddie's past before the X-Men is never revealed, aside from mentioning that he was a syntho-percussionist for a band named the Armageddon Choir. He is a devout believer in Xi'an's dream of mutant equality and the X-Men. After Xi'an is shot, he helps break into the Synge casino to find evidence to clear Xi'an of murdering the owner, Noah Synge. It is revealed that Synge's son Lytton murdered him, so the X-Men are freed and take to the road.

They next search for a woman named Mama Hurricane, for information on the mutant underground railroad during the Great Purge. When they arrive they are attacked by a group of Degens (genetically enhanced humans) calling themselves the Freakshow. Eddie bumps into Contagion, a Freakshow member whose touch infects the victim with a virus of unknown origin and effect. Eddie's body begins to morph and his metallo-mimetic abilities begin manifesting at random. Xi'an is able to heal the virus with his mutant ability but the damage to his body is irreparable.  He is left in a bulky humanoid state, unable to return to plain flesh and trapped in an alloyed state, unable to use his powers to alter his metallic composition.

Mama Hurricane gives them information on where to search next, however Eddie decides to remain with the freakshow, suffering from depression at his new monstrous appearance. He travels with them to the lands of the Keewazi tribe, developing a relationship with Freakshow member Rosa Vasquez. Glitterspike, an assassin and the father of Rosa's unborn baby, attacks the group, intent on stealing his child and selling it to the black market once born. Eddie and the others succeed in trapping Glitterspike in a cave with an alien monster, the Shadow dancer, and is presumed dead. During this battle, Eddie's power to absorb properties of any metal he touches returns, though he still cannot return to flesh.

Months later, Glitterspike returns, having escaped the Shadow dancer, losing an arm in the process. As he attacks Eddie, Rosa goes into labor. Eddie is defeated, but Rosa's unborn baby, who Cerebra stated would be a mutant, incapacitates Glitterspike and they are able to escape. Rosa gives birth to a son, Joaquim Vasquez, and asks Eddie to be his Godfather.

They appear later, being saved by Bloodhawk from bandits while traveling through the desert toward the mutant city-state of Halo City. Eddie meets up with his X-Men brethren for the first time since leaving them to join the Freakshow. Their joy is short-lived as Joaquim is kidnapped by Vulcann, a bloodsmith who can freely alter the bodies of his victims. He accelerates Joaquim's aging, making him appear as a late-teen, early twenties man and fully realizing his mutant abilities. They return to Halo City as the city begins flooding, a product of the melting polar ice caps. Vulcann plans to use Joaquim to lead the mutant generation and bend them to his will. Eddie attempts to stop him but is sent flying across the city by Joaquim.  As he returns he is captured with the rest of the X-Men. A distraction by a crashing Atlantean ship gives Eddie and Bloodhawk the opportunity and they chain Vulcann to a rock beneath the ocean leaving him to die. Eddie leaves, with the others, to get to higher ground, namely the Savage Land.

In the Savage Land, Eddie helps to build a new civilization for humankind, though he has been separated somehow from Rosa and Joaquim. During the final phase of the Phalanx invasion he is completely infected with the techno-organic virus, but as the collective is destroyed his body still retains the virus. He is able to use his ferromorphic abilities to purge it from himself, as Rosa arrives. Shakti, now without her mutant powers and paralyzed, works with Franklin, a semi-sentient robot created by Reed Richards, to study Joaquim and find a way to return him to his proper age.

Eddie recently returned in X-Men Blue, along with the other teammates of X-Men 2099, meeting the original time displaced X-Men. He also appeared as part of the Freakshow, in Multiple Man mini-series.

Powers and abilities
Originally, Metalhead has the ability to transform his body into any metal via physical contact. In either forms, he possesses super strength, high resistance, and whatever specific properties they have, such as adamantium (invulnerability), copper (electrical conductivity), or even gold (enhanced flexibility) dependent upon their type. However, after his battle with Contagion, he is stuck in this hulking metallic form and incapable of reverting back to normal. But, he still can alter the molecular composition of his skin though.

In other media
Metalhead was made into an action figure as part of Toy Biz's X-Men 2099 line.

References

Comics characters introduced in 1993
Fictional characters with superhuman durability or invulnerability
Marvel Comics characters who are shapeshifters
Marvel Comics characters with superhuman strength
Marvel Comics mutants
Marvel 2099 characters
Characters created by John Francis Moore (writer)